Charlie Jeffery  is the Vice Chancellor and President of University of York, UK.

Early life
Jeffery was educated at Loughborough University with a B.A. and a Ph.D. in European Studies.

Personal life 
Jeffery resides in York with his wife and three children.

Career
From 1999-2004, Jeffery was professor of politics at the University of Birmingham, UK. In 2004, he was appointed professor of politics at school of social and political studies, University of Edinburgh, UK. From 2009-2012, he became head of school of social and political studies. In 2012, he was appointed vice principal of public policy and in 2014 as senior vice principal of the University of Edinburgh. In 2019, he joined University of York as vice chancellor and president.

Committees
Jeffery was an ESRC impact champion. He was a director of ESRC devolution and constitutional change programme. He was chair of the UK political studies association. He was an advisor to the House of Commons Select Committee on the Office of the Deputy Prime Minister on the Draft English Regional Assemblies Bill and to the Scottish Parliament's Scotland Bill Committee.

Awards
Jeffery was awarded a CBE in 2016 by the Queen for his contributions in promoting social science on public decision making. He is a fellow of the academy of social sciences.

References 

Living people
British scientists
British sociologists
Alumni of Loughborough University
Academics of the University of Edinburgh
Academics of the University of York
Vice-Chancellors by university in the United Kingdom
Vice-Chancellors of the University of York
1964 births